Johnny Vegas (born 1970), is an English comedian and actor

Johnny Vegas may also refer to:

 Johnny Vegas (musician) (born 1963), American saxophonist
 Johnny Vegas (footballer) (born 1976), Peruvian footballer

See also
 Jhonattan Vegas (born 1984), Venezuelan golfer